El Capitan High School may refer to two schools in the United States:
 El Capitan High School (Arizona)
 El Capitan High School (California)